Halley H. Prosser (March 13, 1870December 22, 1921) was a Michigan politician.

Early life
Halley H. Prosser was born on March 13, 1870, in Lansing, Michigan. Halley was the youngest of 
three siblings. His father was a lawyer named Edwin A. Prosser and his mother was Esther A. Elsworth. Halley received a public school education in Lansing and South Lyon, Michigan. Halley later studied pharmacy in university. In 1889, Halley passed the Michigan Board of Pharmacy's examination. In 1893, Halley moved to Flushing, Michigan.

Career
In Flushing, Prosser worked as a clerk in the drug business for around four years. After four more years in the pharmaceutical business, Prosser gained employment in the grocery business, working for J. E. Ottaway & Company. On November 8, 1904, Prosser was elected to the Michigan House of Representatives where he represented the Genesee County 1st district from January 1, 1905, to January 1, 1909. In the book The Men of '05, editor Harry M. Nimmo poked fun at Prosser's weight and nosiness among other perceived character flaws.

Personal life
On January 6, 1897, Prosser married Winifred O. Ottaway. Winifred was the daughter of James E. Ottaway. Prosser was a Freemason and a member of the Odd Fellows.

Death
Prosser died on December 22, 1921, in his home in Flint, Michigan.

References

1870 births
1921 deaths
American Freemasons
Detroit Business Institute alumni
Politicians from Lansing, Michigan
People from Genesee County, Michigan
Republican Party members of the Michigan House of Representatives
20th-century American politicians